Essam Dhahi (Arabic:عصام ضاحي) (born 19 April 1980) is an Emirati footballer.

References

External links
 

Emirati footballers
1983 births
Living people
Al Shabab Al Arabi Club Dubai players
Al Ahli Club (Dubai) players
Al-Nasr SC (Dubai) players
UAE Pro League players
Association football defenders